Kheta may refer to:
 Kheta (river), a river in Russia
 , a settlement in Taymyrsky Dolgano-Nenetsky District, Russia
 Kheta of Mewar, 14th-century Indian ruler
 Kheta Ram (born 1986), Indian athlete

See also 
 Heta (disambiguation)